Drakotrypa is a mountain village and a community in the municipality of Mouzaki, in the western part of the Karditsa regional unit, Greece. The community consists  of the villages Drakotrypa, Arpakia, Keramargio, Milies, Spathes, Trygona and Tsarouchi. Drakotrypa is located at the foot of the Pindus mountains, 6 km southwest of Mouzaki and 28 km west of Karditsa.

Population

External links
 Drakotrypa on GTP Travel Pages

See also

List of settlements in the Karditsa regional unit

References

Populated places in Karditsa (regional unit)